The 2012 Indian Premier League season, abbreviated as IPL 5 or the IPL 2012 or the DLF IPL 2012 (owing to title sponsorship reasons), was the fifth season of the Indian Premier League, initiated by the Board of Control for Cricket in India (BCCI) in 2007 with the first season played in 2008. The tournament began on 4 April and ended on 27 May 2012. Kolkata Knight Riders were the winning team, beating defending champions Chennai Super Kings by five wickets in the final. This season the number of teams in the league went from ten to nine with the termination of Kochi Tuskers Kerala.The tagline was Aisa mauka aur kaha milega? (where will you get such an opportunity ?)

Despite a slow start, IPL 5 earned a higher cumulative viewership than any previous edition of the IPL. The cumulative reach for 74 IPL 5 matches was recorded at 163 million against 162 million for 73 matches in IPL 4, and the final match had a higher reach than any previous final. The IPL 2012 edition was the most competitive season of which produced many nail biting finishes. In the 2012 season, there were 19 matches which produced results in the last over, and a couple of them produced results in the last ball. There were also 6 matches in which team won by a margin of less than 10 runs. Near the end of the season, the season faced various hurdles including a spot fixing case, which allegedly included 5 players caught on a sting operation carried on by a local news channel.

The top four teams of the tournament (Kolkata Knight Riders, Chennai Super Kings, Delhi Daredevils and Mumbai Indians) represented India in the 2012 Champions League Twenty20. The Fair Play Award was won by Rajasthan Royals, while Kings XI Punjab batsman Mandeep Singh was named the tournament's "Rising Star" and  Kolkata Knight Riders bowler Sunil Narine was Player of the Season. This along with 2009, 2016, and 2021 are the only editions where a team topping the table at the end of league stage did not appear in the final.

Termination of Kochi

The IPL Committee terminated the Kochi Tuskers Kerala franchise after it breached the BCCI's terms of conditions. Under the terms of the agreement, each franchise has to submit a bank guarantee every year that covers the fee payable to the BCCI. The team, founded in 2010, was bought for  1,550 crore and the consortium has to pay a bank guarantee of  1.56 billion every year until 2020. Despite this, the Tuskers' former players participated in this season's competition after being included in the players auction on 4 February 2012.

On 13 January, the BCCI asked the international players of Kochi Tuskers Kerala to register the individual court cases against the owners of the Kochi IPL team with the BCCI included as a party to each case.

Venues

Opening ceremony

The opening ceremony was held on 3 April night in Chennai at the YMCA Ground. The ceremony included some performances by Amitabh Bachchan, Priyanka Chopra, Kareena Kapoor, Salman Khan, Prabhu Deva, Colonial Cousins, and Katy Perry. The opening game was held in the M. A. Chidambaram Stadium, Chennai, the home venue of the reigning champions Chennai Super Kings. The closing ceremony will also be held at the same venue.

Teams and standings

Points table
("C" refers to the "Champions" of the Tournament. 'R'(2nd Position), '3' and '4' are the positions of the respective teams in the tournament.)

Results

Group stage

Group stage

Playoff stage
On 15 March, it was announced that due to the municipal election in Delhi, the playoff schedule was being slightly altered. The sites of 22 and 23 May matches were changed, with Pune now hosting the first qualifier on 22 May and Bengaluru hosting the eliminator on 23 May. Had the Royal Challengers Bangalore qualified for the playoffs, they would play the match in Bengaluru, switching which venue hosts which match if necessary.

Qualifier 1

Eliminator

Qualifier 2

Final

Statistics
Overall, 22,453 runs were scored at an average of 26.20. 857 wickets fell. Both the number of runs and of wickets were new IPL records. Six centuries were scored.

Most runs

 The leading run scorer of the league phase wore an orange cap while fielding.

Most wickets

 The leading wicket taker of the league phase wore a purple cap while fielding.

Special awards

Reception and controversies

Initial viewership
The first matches of the season had recorded an average Television Viewership Rating (TVR) of 3.76, 18.7% less than the previous season. The viewership was also reportedly low for the opening ceremony with a rating of 1.3 TVR. The decline was attributed to the number of matches being played, as the count stands at 76 among 9 teams. The rating continued to fall as the cumulative number of people who tuned in to watch the first 16 games also declined from 127.40 million in 2011 to 122.44 million.

However, despite this slow start, IPL 5 garnered a higher cumulative viewership than any previous edition of the IPL. The cumulative reach for 74 IPL 5 matches was recorded at 163 million against 162 million for 73 matches in IPL 4, and the final match had a higher reach than any previous final.

Spot fixing
On 14 May 2012, an Indian news channel India TV aired a sting operation that accused five players involved in spot fixing. Reacting to the news, Chief manager of Indian Premier League Rajiv Shukla immediately suspended all five: Mohnish Mishra, Shalabh Srivastava, TP Sudhindra, Amit Yadav, and Abhinav Bali (none of whom had played international cricket). However, the report went on to claim that none of the cricketers were found guilty. On the reliability of the report, Rajat Sharma, the editor-in-chief of news channel India TV quoted that the channel had no doubts about the authenticity of the sting operation and prepared to go to court.

Mohnish Mishra who was part of Pune Warriors India team for the season, admitted to have said that franchises pay black money, in a sting operation. He was also suspended from his team.

Other charges
9 April: Sharukh Khan, owner of the Kolkata Knight Riders, was served a notice by the Rajasthan Police for smoking in public. Khan was caught smoking on camera during a match between the Kolkata Knight Riders, the IPL team he owns, and the Rajasthan Royals on 8 April.
16 May: Shahrukh Khan, owner of the Kolkata Knight Riders, received a five-year ban from the Wankhede Stadium for arguing with security at the ground after a match.
18 May: Luke Pomersbach, a Royal Challengers Bangalore batsman, was arrested on charges of molesting an American woman. He was later granted interim bail.
20 May: Rahul Sharma and Wayne Parnell, Pune Warriors India players, were detained by Mumbai Police along with hundreds at a rave party bust.

See also
 List of 2012 Indian Premier League personnel changes
 2012 Champions League Twenty20

References

External links
 Tournament site on ESPN CricInfo

 
Indian Premier League seasons
Premier League
Indian Premier League